Shamsur Rahman Sherif (12 March 1941 – 2 April 2020) was a Bangladesh Awami League politician who served as Ministry of Land. He was a 5-term Jatiya Sangsad member representing the Pabna-4 constituency.

Early life 
Sherif was born on 12 March 1941 in Char Shanirdiar, Pabna Sadar Upazila, Pabna District, East Bengal, British Raj. He completed his B.S. degree from Govt. Edward College, Pabna.

Career 
Sherif was elected to parliament in the General Election of June 1996 as a candidate of the Awami League from Pabna-4. He received 66,424 votes while his closest rival, Sirajul Islam Sarder of Bangladesh Nationalist Party, received 55,944 votes.

Sherif was re-elected in the General Election in 2001 as a candidate of Awami League from Pabna-4. He received 85,311 votes while his nearest rival, Sirajul Islam Sarder of Bangladesh Nationalist Party, received 65,721 votes.

Sherif was re-elected in the General Election of 2008 as a candidate of Awami League from Pabna-4. He received 147,334 votes while his nearest rival, Sirajul Islam Sarder of Bangladesh Nationalist Party, received 104,901 votes.

Sherif was re-elected unopposed in the 2014 general election from Pabna-4 after opposition parties withdrew their candidacies in a boycott of the election. He was a member of the Pabna District Awami League and was appointed Minister of Land.

Sherif's son, Shirhan Sharif Tomal, was arrested for attacking journalists in Pabna in December 2017. He was the president of Ishwardi upazila Jubo League but was expelled after the incident. He also has a case against him for attacking and robbing the home of a "freedom fighter" (veteran of Bangladesh Liberation war).

In April 2018, Sherif's personal officer, Kutubuddin Ahmed, was arrested for grabbing a land near Gulshan-Baridhara by the Anti-Corruption Commission.

Sherif was re-elected in the 2018 Bangladeshi general election as a candidate of Awami League from Pabna-4. He received 249,558 votes while his nearest rival, Md Habibur Rahman of Bangladesh Nationalist Party, 48,822. He lost his Minister of Land position in the newly formed cabinet.

Death 
Sherif died on 2 April 2020. After his death, his constituency Pabna-4 became vacant and Nuruzzaman Biswas was elected in a by-election.

References

1940 births
2020 deaths
People from Pabna District
Awami League politicians
Land ministers of Bangladesh
7th Jatiya Sangsad members
8th Jatiya Sangsad members
9th Jatiya Sangsad members
10th Jatiya Sangsad members
11th Jatiya Sangsad members
Pabna Edward College alumni
Deaths from the COVID-19 pandemic in Bangladesh